The Yokohama Concert is a live album by jazz trombonist J. J. Johnson and trumpeter Nat Adderley recorded in 1977 for the Pablo Live label and originally released as a double LP.

Reception

The Allmusic review by Scott Yanow observed "The music is challenging and well-played if not overly exciting, but it did result in J.J. Johnson returning to a much busier schedule as a trombonist again".

Track listing
All compositions by J. J. Johnson except where noted.
 "Horace" - 6:57
 "Cyclops" (Nat Adderley) - 	6:18
 "Why Not" - 8:34
 "Splashes" - 7:18
 "It Happens" (Tony Dumas) - 10:02
 "Work Song" (Adderley) - 6:00
 "Walkin'" (Richard Carpenter) - 9:44
 "Jevin" - 5:16
 "Lament" - 3:21
 "Hummin'" (Adderley) - 8:27
 "Melodee" - 8:51

Personnel 
J. J. Johnson - trombone, arranger
Nat Adderley - trumpet
Billy Childs - piano
Tony Dumas - bass
Kevin Johnson - drums

References 

1978 live albums
Pablo Records live albums
J. J. Johnson live albums
Nat Adderley live albums
Albums produced by Norman Granz